Central African Republic–North Korea relations refers to the current and historical relationship between the Central African Republic and the North Korea (DPRK). Neither country maintains an embassy in their respective capitals.

History

During the Cold War, the DPRK maintained a close relationship with the long-time military ruler of the Central African Republic, Jean-Bédel Bokassa. While Bokassa was an anti-communist, this appears to have had no effect on their relationship. Diplomatic relations between the two countries began on 5 September 1969.

In 1976, Bokassa proclaimed himself Emperor Bokassa I, and declared the Central African Empire. The eccentric dictator's first foreign visit after his lavish coronation was to Pyongyang. He returned to Pyongyang in 1978 just ahead of a Franco-African Summit in Paris, and signed a treaty of peace and friendship with Kim Il-sung.

Friendly relations continued even after Bokassa was overthrown in 1979. In March 1986 it was estimated that the DPRK was supplying 13 technicians to the Central African Republic, seemingly to counter South Korean influence in the country.

See also

 Foreign relations of the Central African Republic
 Foreign relations of North Korea

References

North Korea
Central African Republic